Paavo Erkki Arhinmäki (born 13 December 1976, in Helsinki) is a Finnish politician, a member of the Finnish Parliament and a former Minister for Culture and Sport, representing the Left Alliance, a party whose leader he was from 2009 to 2016. He was first elected to the Finnish Parliament in the 2007 election and re-elected in 2011. Arhinmäki has been a member of the City Council of Helsinki since 2001. He led the Left Youth in 2001–2005. He proposed a halt to nuclear power projects in Finland in the wake of the Great Hanshin earthquake.

After the 2011 election, the Left Alliance became a partner in the six-party grand coalition cabinet led by Jyrki Katainen. Being a football enthusiast, Arhinmäki became Minister for Culture and Sport and the party gained another ministerial portfolio as well. The decision to join the government created a split in the party, leading to the expulsion of two MPs from the parliamentary group. Later Arhinmäki became the subject of media criticism after a drinking binge at the Sochi Winter Olympics in February 2014. In 2014 Left Alliance left the cabinet over a dispute on a package of spending cuts and tax rises.

In 2012 Arhinmäki was a Left Alliance candidate in the Finnish Presidential Elections, finishing 6th with 5.5% of the total votes in the first round of voting.

In April 2016, Arhinmäki announced that he wouldn't seek another term as the party leader. On 11 June 2016, he was followed by Li Andersson.

References

External links

Parliament of Finland: Paavo Arhinmäki 

1976 births
Living people
Politicians from Helsinki
Left Alliance (Finland) politicians
Government ministers of Finland
Members of the Parliament of Finland (2007–11)
Members of the Parliament of Finland (2011–15)
Members of the Parliament of Finland (2015–19)
Members of the Parliament of Finland (2019–23)
Candidates for President of Finland